The 2nd Awit Awards were held on July 16, 1970. They honored achievements in the Philippine music industry for the year 1969. This was the first time the Philippine Academy of Recording Arts and Sciences (PARAS) presented these awards after the Awit Awards Executive Committee was dissolved.

Twenty-five awards were given that night. The foreign division was scrapped after last year's ceremony. George Canseco had the most awards with three.

Winners

General

People

Instrumental

Composing, lyric writing and arranging

Production

Packaging and notes

Special awards

Notes:

It is currently unknown which song of the Pandacan Original Brass Band won the "Best Special Recording".

References

Awit Awards
1970 music awards
1970 in the Philippines